Pua Kele Kealoha (November 14, 1902 – August 29, 1989) was an American competition swimmer, Olympic champion, and former world record-holder. He was not related to Olympic swimming champion Warren Kealoha.

Kealoha represented the United States at the 1920 Summer Olympics in Antwerp, Belgium as a 17-year-old.  He won a gold medal as a member of the winning U.S. team in the men's 4×200-meter freestyle relay with teammates Perry McGillivray, Norman Ross and Duke Kahanamoku.  The U.S. relay team set a new world record of 10:04.4 in the event final.  Individually, Kealoha also received a silver medal for his second-place performance in the men's 100-meter freestyle and finished with a time of 1:02.6.

According to a member of the Kahanamoku family who knew him, Kealoha was the only person to swim unassisted from Molokai to Oahu.  He had previously tried to swim from Oahu to Molokai but failed due to the headwind, current, and waves.

See also
 List of Olympic medalists in swimming (men)
 World record progression 4 × 200 metres freestyle relay

References

External links

 

1902 births
1989 deaths
American male freestyle swimmers
World record setters in swimming
Native Hawaiian sportspeople
Olympic gold medalists for the United States in swimming
Olympic silver medalists for the United States in swimming
People from Honolulu County, Hawaii
Swimmers at the 1920 Summer Olympics
Medalists at the 1920 Summer Olympics